Vlasis is both a given name and a surname. Notable people with the name include:
Evangelos Vlasis (1944), Greek athlete
Vlasis Gavriilidis (1848–1920), Greek journalist
Vlasis Kazakis (1983), retired Greek footballer
Vlasis Maras (1983), Greek gymnast
Vlasis Vlaikidis (1965), Greek basketball coach

See also 
Vlassis